Moses Naserat Romario Banggo (born May 9, 1990 in Abepura, Jayapura, Papua) is an Indonesian footballer who plays as a midfielder.

Honours

Club
Persipura Jayapura
Indonesia Super League (1): 2010–11
Indonesian Inter Island Cup (1): 2011

Persiram Raja Ampat
Indonesian Inter Island Cup (1): 2014
Indonesia Super League (5): 2014

External links
 Profile in Liga Indonesia Official Website 

1990 births
Living people
People from Jayapura
Papuan people
Indonesian footballers
Persipura Jayapura players
Persiram Raja Ampat players
Persepam Madura Utama players
Kalteng Putra F.C. players
Persewar Waropen players
Indonesian expatriate footballers
Indonesian expatriate sportspeople in East Timor
Expatriate footballers in East Timor
Liga 1 (Indonesia) players
Liga 2 (Indonesia) players
Association football midfielders
Sportspeople from Papua